Parque Avellaneda is a neighbourhood located in the Southwest of Buenos Aires. It is named after Nicolás Avellaneda, former President of Argentina and originated in a 1755 deed given to the Brotherhood of Holy Charity of Jesus Christ. The Olivera family became the area's largest landowners in 1828 and their sale of the majority of their estate to the city of Buenos Aires resulted in the creation of Avellaneda Park (the barrio's namesake) in 1914.

See also

 Avellaneda Park Historic Train
 Avellaneda Park

External links
 Barriada.com site

Neighbourhoods of Buenos Aires